Uspenka is a rural locality (a selo) and the administrative center of Uspensky Selsoviet of Loktevsky District, Altai Krai, Russia. The population was 1,002 in 2016. There are 12 streets.

Geography 
Uspenka is located 7 km southeast of Gornyak (the district's administrative centre) by road. Fabrichka is the nearest rural locality.

References 

Rural localities in Loktevsky District